Kawkawa Lake is a lake located  east of Hope, British Columbia. Kawkawa is also the name for the neighbourhood in Hope surrounding Kawkawa Lake.

The lake is home to many species of fish, but it is best known for its large kokanee (land-locked salmon), which can reach up to 3+ lbs in weight.

Kawkawa Lake Park is situated on the lake and has amenities such as: toilets, swimming beach, grassy play area, park benches with picnic tables and a small dock that has a concrete boat launch. 

There was also a privately operated resort and campground on the lake's shore. This was shut down in 2019, where boats are also welcome. Water sports around the lake include: skiing, wake boarding, tubing, jet skiing, as well as dune buggy rentals.

Another activity for visitors is hiking through the nearby Othello Tunnels, located only 15 minutes from the town of Hope.

The Kawkawa Lake Indian Reserve No. 16 is located on the southeastern shore of the lake, and is one of the reserves under the administration of the Hope-area Union Bar First Nation.

Stó:lō history

The name of the lake is from the Halq'eméylem word Q'áwq'ewem, meaning "home of loons", after two loons that once lived here: q'ewq'weelacha and q'ewq'ewelot. There is also another story about a young man who jumped from the rocky bluffs on the north side of the lake, plunging all the way to the bottom landing on a pit house. The dim light from the pit house was later seen deep below the water, by a woman passing by.

When a dam was built later, it adversely effected the salmon run up the Kw'ikw'iya:la (Coquihalla River).

References

Lakes of the Lower Mainland
Sto:lo
Yale Division Yale Land District